"Just Outside of Heaven" is a song by Scottish pop band H2O, composed by all of the band members and produced by Tony Cox. Initially released in 1983, the song was later included on H2O's debut studio album, Faith (1984). The single features the non-album track, "Stranger to Stranger" as its B-side, which was later included as a bonus track on the CD reissue of the Faith album. It was their last single to make the Top 40 on the UK Singles Chart, peaking at No. 38.

Track listing
 12" Maxi
"Just Outside of Heaven (Extended Mix)"
"Stranger to Stranger"
"Just Outside of Heaven (6 A.M. Mix)"

 7" Single
"Just Outside of Heaven"
"Stranger to Stranger"

Chart performance

References

External links
 

1983 singles
H2O (Scottish band) songs
RCA Records singles
1983 songs